Lactucin is a bitter substance that forms a white crystalline solid and belongs to the group of sesquiterpene lactones.  It is found in some varieties of lettuce and is an ingredient of lactucarium.  It has been shown to have analgesic and sedative properties. It has also shown some antimalarial effects. It is also found in dandelion coffee.

It acts as an adenosine receptor agonist.

See also 
 Lactucopicrin

References 

Sesquiterpene lactones
Primary alcohols
Secondary alcohols
Enones
Azulenofurans
Cyclopentenes
Lactones
Vinylidene compounds